Balokassar  is a village and union council, an administrative subdivision, of Chakwal District in the Punjab Province of Pakistan, it is part of Chakwal Tehsil. The village gets its name from the Kassar tribe, who also make up the majority of the population. It is one of a cluster of villages such as Balkassar, which form the tribal homeland of the Kassar.

References

Union councils of Chakwal District
Populated places in Chakwal District